Boronia jucunda is a plant in the citrus family Rutaceae and is endemic to the far north-west of Australia. It is an erect shrub with many branches, pinnate leaves and white, four-petalled flowers. It is only known from a small area in the Kimberley region in Western Australia and in a national park in the Northern Territory.

Description
Its branches and leaves are covered with star-like hairs. Single white flowers are arranged in leaf axils on a very short pedicel. The sepals are longer and wider than the petals and all are white. Flowering occurs from May to June.

Taxonomy and naming
Boronia jucunda was first formally described in 1997 by Marco F. Duretto who published the description in  Nuytsia. The specific epithet (jucunda) is a Latin word meaning "pleasing", referring to the pleasant small of the leaves when crushed.

Distribution and habitat
Boronia jucunda grows in open woodland, especially in rocky areas with less grass. It is found near the edge of Winnama Gorge in the east Kimberley region and in the Judbarra National Park in the Northern Territory.

Conservation
This boronia is classified as "Priority One" by the Government of Western Australia Department of Parks and Wildlife meaning that it is known from only one or a few locations which are potentially at risk.

References 

jucunda
Flora of the Northern Territory
Flora of Western Australia
Plants described in 1997
Taxa named by Marco Duretto